Daryl Berdene Robertson (January 5, 1936 – July 31, 2018) was an American professional baseball player. The infielder appeared in nine Major League games in May 1962 for the Chicago Cubs. Born in Cripple Creek, Colorado, Robertson attended the University of Utah.

He was signed by the New York Giants as an amateur free agent in 1954 but was acquired by the Milwaukee Braves in the December 1956 minor league draft.  He spent four seasons in the Braves' system without reaching the Triple-A level.  Then, at the close of spring training in 1961, he was traded to the Cubs with fellow infielder Andre Rodgers for pitchers Moe Drabowsky and Seth Morehead.

Rodgers was the Cubs' starting shortstop in both 1961 and 1962.  Most of Robertson's big-league service time came when Rodgers was injured in May 1962.  He started five games at shortstop (and one at third base) between May 11–19, and notched two hits in 19 total at bats. Both safeties came on the same day, May 12 against the Philadelphia Phillies at Wrigley Field.  The Cubs traded Robertson to the St. Louis Cardinals June 5, but he never appeared in a big-league game for the Redbirds. He spent the rest of the 1962 campaign, his last in baseball, in the minor leagues.

Robertson died July 31, 2018.

References

External links

1936 births
2018 deaths
Atlanta Crackers players
Austin Senators players
Baseball players from Colorado
Baseball players from Utah
Chicago Cubs players
Danville Dans players
Jacksonville Braves players
Major League Baseball shortstops
Muskogee Giants players
People from Cripple Creek, Colorado
St. Cloud Rox players
San Antonio Missions players
Topeka Hawks players
Tulsa Oilers (baseball) players
Yakima Braves players